Horizon is a series of action role-playing games developed by Guerrilla Games and published by Sony Interactive Entertainment for PlayStation 4, PlayStation 5 and Microsoft Windows. The series follows the adventures of Aloy, a young huntress in a world overrun by machines, who sets out to uncover her past.

The series consists of two main games: Horizon Zero Dawn, Horizon Forbidden West, alongside a spin-off VR title Horizon Call of the Mountain. A live-action television series based on the games is in the works by PlayStation Productions for Netflix.

Plot 
The story is set in a post-apocalyptic United States, between the states of Colorado, Wyoming, Utah, California and Nevada in the 31st century. Humans live in scattered, primitive tribes with varying levels of technological development. Their technologically advanced predecessors are remembered as the "Old Ones". Large robotic creatures, known as "machines", dominate the Earth. For the most part, they peacefully coexist with humans, who occasionally hunt them for parts. A phenomenon known as the "Derangement" has caused machines to become more aggressive towards humans, and larger and deadlier machines have begun to appear. There are four tribes that are prominently featured: the Nora, the Banuk, the Carja and the Oseram. The Nora are fierce hunter-gatherers who live in the mountains and worship nature as the "All-Mother". The Carja are desert-dwelling city builders who worship the Sun. The Banuk consists of wandering clans made up of hunters and shamans who live in snowy mountains and worship the machines and their "songs". The Oseram are tinkerers and salvagers known for their metalworking, brewing, and talent as warriors.

Gameplay 
Horizon is an action role-playing game played from a third-person perspective. The player controls Aloy, a hunter in a world populated by dangerous, animalistic machines. In an open world, she explores a post-apocalyptic version of the United States.

Aloy can dodge, sprint, slide, or roll to evade her enemies' advances. Hiding in foliage to ambush nearby enemies can ensure immediate takedowns. Swimming may reach enemies stealthily or places otherwise unreachable on foot. She is able to hack a selection of machines with the Override Tool, some of which can be turned into makeshift mounts. Explorable ruins called Cauldrons unlock additional machines to override. Three categories occur in the skill tree: "Prowler" concerns stealth, "Brave" improves combat, and "Forager" increases healing and gathering capabilities. To level up, Aloy attains experience points from individual kills and completing quests. Upgrades in each category result in more adept use of the skills learned, with "Prowler" leading to silent takedowns, "Brave" to aiming a bow in slow motion, and "Forager" to an enlarged medicine pouch.

Games

Horizon Zero Dawn 

The first game in the series, released in 2017. Aloy (Ashly Burch) is cast out from the Nora tribe at birth and raised by a fellow outcast named Rost (JB Blanc). As a child (Ava Potter), Aloy obtains a Focus, an augmented reality device that gives her special perceptive abilities. Aloy becomes curious about her origins and is told by Rost that if she wins the Proving, a competition to earn the right to become a member of the Nora, the tribe's Matriarchs might concede this information. Aloy spends some years training in combat and survival under Rost's instruction.

Horizon Forbidden West 

The second game in the series, released in 2022 as a followup to the first game's story. Six months after the defeat of HADES, Aloy searches for a backup of GAIA to reverse the planet's degrading biosphere. Aloy and her friend Varl search a facility once belonging to Far Zenith, a company specializing in space colonization; they find a GAIA backup, but it has been sabotaged. Sylens contacts Aloy, having stolen GAIA's subsystem HADES, and asks to meet her in the Forbidden West region.

Horizon Call of the Mountain

Other appearances 
The series is referenced in other video games where Aloy appears as a playable character in the PlayStation 4 version of Monster Hunter: World and makes a cameo appearance in Astro's Playroom. Aloy was added to Fortnite Battle Royale on April 15, 2021, for the Chapter 2, Season 6 "Primal" event. A limited time "Aloy Cup" was available to PlayStation players, while a "Team Up!" mode with Lara Croft from Tomb Raider was added. She received an extra style called Ice Hunter, which is only available to players that own a PlayStation 5. but can be used across all consoles when unlocked. In September 2021, Aloy was given out as a free character for PS4 and PS5 players of the game Genshin Impact, while players on other platforms received her for free in October 2021. In the game, she is a Bow user of the Cryo element.

Other media and adaptations 
The Horizon franchise includes various types of media and adaptations outside of the video games, including comics, a board game, and a television series.

Comic series adaptation 
The Horizon universe was adapted into a comic book in 2020, with the release of Horizon Zero Dawn: The Sunhawk. The comic book bridges the gap between Horizon Zero Dawn and Forbidden West. A second comic, called Liberation, was released in 2022.

Board game adaptation 
A licensed board game was released in 2020. The co-operative board game, created by SteamForge, includes story elements that take place right after Horizon: Zero Dawn.

Television series 
In May 2022, it was announced that a streaming television series adaptation is in development at PlayStation Productions and Sony Pictures Television for Netflix, with Steve Blackman developing the series. Aloy will be one of the main characters in the series.

References

External links 
 Official website

Video game franchises
Video game franchises introduced in 2017
Action-adventure games
Open-world video games
Post-apocalyptic video games
Science fiction video games
Sony Interactive Entertainment franchises
Action role-playing video games by series
Augmented reality in fiction
Decima (game engine) games
Dystopian video games
Fiction set in the 4th millennium
Genocide in fiction
Guerrilla Games games
Horizon Zero Dawn
Hunting in video games